The Zagorje-Trbovlje subdialect (zagorsko-trboveljski govor) is a Slovene subdialect in the Styrian dialect group. It is a subdialect of the Lower Sava Valley dialect and is spoken in the Central Sava Valley, including the settlements of Zagorje ob Savi, Trbovlje, and Hrastnik.

Phonological and morphological characteristics
The Zagorje-Trbovlje subdialect has a vowel system characterized by ie and uo-type diphthongs, like the Lower Carniolan dialects, but unlike these dialects it has stress accent rather than a pitch accent.

References

Slovene dialects in Styria (Slovenia)